Air time or airtime may refer to:

Air time (broadcasting), also spelled "airtime", available hours for broadcast or time purchased for broadcast
Air time (mobile phone), also spelled "airtime", top-up for mobile roaming services
Air time, also spelled "airtime", amount of radio airplay for a record in popular music
Air time (rides), also spelled "airtime" , negative g forces in amusement rides 
Air time (parachuting), also spelled "airtime" , time before the parachute opens in skydiving

Entertainment
Airtime (band), 2007 project of Canadian guitarist Rik Emmett
Air Time, 1978 jazz album by Air
Air Time: The Best of Glass Tiger, album 1993
Air Time '57, 1957 TV series
Michael Jordan Air Time, 1992 documentary TV film of Michael Jordan and the Chicago Bulls' 1991–92 season

Business
Airtime (software), freeware radio management application originally named LiveSupport, and then Campcaster developed in 2003 by Micz Flor, a German new-media developer.
Airtime.com, live video website
Airtime Television TV news broadcast syndication agency and production company based at London Heathrow Airport
Airtime Management and Programming Sdn Bhd, Malaysian broadcaster, now Astro Radio
Airtime Products, defunct Australian aircraft manufacturer specialized in the design and manufacture of paramotors
Airtime Discovery, Australian paramotor for powered paragliding
Airtime Explorer, an Australian powered hang glider that was designed and produced by Airtime Products of Airlie Beach, Queensland. Now out of production